Vikhlyayevka is a rural locality (a selo) and the administrative center of Vikhlyayevskoye Rural Settlement, Povorinsky District, Voronezh Oblast, Russia. The population was 530 as of 2010. There are 3 streets.

Geography 
Vikhlyayevka is located 58 km east of Povorino (the district's administrative centre) by road. Sukhaya Yelan is the nearest rural locality.

References 

Rural localities in Povorinsky District